The knobbly nudibranch, Aegires ninguis, is a species of dorid nudibranch. It is a marine gastropod mollusc in the family Aegiridae.

Distribution
This species is found off the South African coast from the Atlantic coast of the Cape Peninsula to Port Elizabeth. It is found from the intertidal to at least 30 m. It is endemic.

Description
The knobbly nudibranch is a small (up to 15 mm) white-bodied dorid with numerous knobbles projecting from its body. Its rhinophores emerge from knobbled sheaths.

Ecology
This species may feed on encrusting sponges.

References

External links
  Willan, R. (2016) Aegires ninguis. At Nudipixel, accessed 2016-01-07.

Aegiridae
Gastropods described in 2004